Horseshoe Mountain is a high mountain summit in the Mosquito Range of the Rocky Mountains of North America.

Cirque
The mountain has a unique and prominent cirque. The cirque is tilted and made up of Paleozoic sedimentary rocks that formed on the floors of ancient seas. It is rare to find sedimentary rocks this high up in Colorado's higher elevations, for most sedimentary stata in the high country were eroded away by glaciers during the ice age. In this case, the glaciers sculpted the strata into a horseshoe shape without eroding it completely.

See also

List of Colorado mountain ranges
List of Colorado mountain summits
List of Colorado fourteeners
List of Colorado 4000 meter prominent summits
List of the most prominent summits of Colorado
List of Colorado county high points

References

Mountains of Colorado
Mountains of Lake County, Colorado
Mountains of Park County, Colorado
Pike National Forest
San Isabel National Forest
North American 4000 m summits